"Busy Doin' Nothin'" is a song by the American rock band the Beach Boys from their 1968 album Friends. Written by Brian Wilson, the lyrics reflect the minutiae of his daily social and business life, while the music, Wilson said, was inspired by "bossa nova in general".

Recording

"Busy Doin' Nothin'" was recorded over two dates, one for the basic instrumental track and another for overdubs, including the vocal track. The basic instrumental track was recorded at Beach Boys Studio on March 26, 1968, under the working titles "Even Steven" and "Even Time". The session used several members of the Wrecking Crew.

Overdubs and the vocal track were recorded on April 11, 1968, at ID Sound, California. The vocal track has Brian singing the lead vocal, briefly joined by his then-wife Marilyn Wilson who sings with Brian during the second bridge.

Biographer John Tobler noted a resemblance between Wilson's vocal performance and that of Chris Montez's on the latter's 1966 rendition of "The More I See You".

Live performances
"Busy Doin' Nothin'" was performed in the early 2000s by Brian Wilson during his Pet Sounds solo tour as well as the No Pier Pressure tour in 2015. The song was performed as part of the Brian Wilson & The Zombies: Something Great From '68 2019 tour.

Cover versions

 2000 – Camping, Caroline Now!

Personnel
Per Craig Slowinski.

The Beach Boys
 Brian Wilson - lead vocals, backing vocals

Guest
 Marilyn Wilson - lead vocals (doubled with Brian in some places), backing vocals

Session musicians

 Jim Ackley - keyboard
 Al Vescovo - guitars
 Lyle Ritz - upright basses
 Alan Estes - vibes & blocks
 Gene Pello - drums
 David Sherr - oboe 
 Tom Scott - bass flute
 Don Englert - clarinet
 Jay Migliori - bass clarinet

References

1968 songs
The Beach Boys songs
Songs written by Brian Wilson
Song recordings produced by Brian Wilson